Chihaia is a Romanian surname. Notable people with the surname include:

Octavian Chihaia (born 1981), Romanian footballer, son of Romulus
Pavel Chihaia (1922–2019), Romanian novelist
Romulus Chihaia (born 1952), Romanian footballer and manager
Scarlett Bordeaux, ring name of Elizabeth Chihaia (born 1991), American professional wrestler and valet of Romanian descent

Romanian-language surnames